Drita Pelingu (3 December 1926 – 3 October 2013) was an Albanian actress, academic and director. She was awarded the title of Merited Artist of Albania. 

Pelingu died following a long illness on 2 October 2013, aged 86, in Tirana.

References

1926 births
2013 deaths
Albanian actresses
Albanian film actresses
Albanian stage actresses
Merited Artists of Albania
People from Vlorë
20th-century Albanian actresses
21st-century Albanian actresses